Merlin Gray Hull (December 18, 1870 – May 17, 1953) was a lawyer, a newspaper publisher, and a member of the United States House of Representatives from Wisconsin.

Born in Farina, Illinois to John and Adelia Hull, Merlin Hull was a graduate of Gale College, De Pauw University, and Columbian University (now The George Washington University Law School). He was admitted to the bar in 1894 and commenced practice in Black River Falls. He served as publisher of the Jackson County Journal from 1904 to 1926 and of the merged Banner-Journal for the rest of his life (1926–1953). He served as district attorney of Jackson County from 1907 to 1909; he was a Republican member of the Wisconsin State Assembly from 1909 to 1915, serving as speaker in the 1913-15 session; he was elected Secretary of State in 1916, serving until 1921.

Hull was first elected (as a Republican) to the Seventy-first Congress in 1928. He represented Wisconsin's 7th congressional district. He was an unsuccessful candidate for renomination in 1930 and an unsuccessful independent candidate in 1932. In 1934, Hull was once again elected to the House of Representatives this time as part of the Seventy-fourth Congress. He was elected as a member of the Progressive Party and represented Wisconsin's 9th congressional district. He was reelected to this post for the succeeding nine congresses, as a member of the Progressive Party for the first six and after the disbanding of the Wisconsin Progressive Party, as a Republican to the other four, serving continuously from January 3, 1935, until his death from pulmonary complications following surgery in La Crosse, Wisconsin on May 17, 1953.

Congressional election history

See also
 List of secretaries of state of Wisconsin
 List of United States Congress members who died in office (1950–1999)

References

External links
 

1870 births
1953 deaths
Republican Party members of the Wisconsin State Assembly
Speakers of the Wisconsin State Assembly
People from Warsaw, Indiana
Politicians from La Crosse, Wisconsin
Secretaries of State of Wisconsin
Wisconsin Progressives (1924)
Gale College alumni
DePauw University alumni
George Washington University Law School alumni
Editors of Wisconsin newspapers
Republican Party members of the United States House of Representatives from Wisconsin
Progressive Party (1924) members of the United States House of Representatives
20th-century American politicians
19th-century American lawyers
20th-century American lawyers
District attorneys in Wisconsin